Guilt by Association Vol. 2 is a compilation album released November 18, 2008 by Engine Room Recordings. Like its predecessor, Guilt by Association Vol. 1, it features indie rock artists covering well-known pop and R&B songs.

Overview
The second in a series of compilations released by Engine Room Recordings, Guilt by Association Vol. 2 features indie rock artists, including My Brightest Diamond and Frightened Rabbit, covering their favorite guilty pleasure pop songs.  Conceived and compiled by Engine Room Recordings, the album brings together a variety of artists in the indie scene.
 
The third album in the series was released on November 15, 2011, entitled Guilt by Association Vol. 3.

Track listing

See also
Guilt by Association Vol. 1
Guilt by Association Vol. 3

References

External links
Official Myspace of GbA
Official website by Engine Room Recordings
Official Facebook fanpage

2008 compilation albums
Covers albums
Engine Room Recordings albums